Rafail Mamas (born 4 March 2001) is a Cypriot professional footballer who plays for AEK Larnaca as a midfielder.

Club career
On 13 May 2018, Mamas made his senior debut for AEK Larnaca, playing the full ninety minutes in a 3–2 win over AEL Limassol.

On 26 July 2018, Mamas was an unused substitute in Larnaca's 0–0 draw away to Dundalk in the UEFA Europa League but the next month, he joined Serie A club Napoli.

In September 2020, Mamas joined Serie B side SPAL.

On 19 July 2021, Mamas returned to AEK Larnaca after three years in Italy.

International career
Mamas has represented Cyprus at under-17 level. In October 2021, he received his first call-up to the senior squad for 2022 FIFA World Cup qualifying matches against Croatia and Malta following an injury to Andreas Karo. He was an unused substitute in both matches. He made his debut on 11 November 2021 in a World Cup qualifier against Russia.

Career statistics

Club

References

External links

Living people
2001 births
AEK Larnaca FC players
Cyprus youth international footballers
Cyprus under-21 international footballers
Cyprus international footballers
Cypriot First Division players
Association football midfielders
Cypriot expatriate footballers
Cypriot expatriate sportspeople
Expatriate footballers in Italy
Cypriot footballers
S.P.A.L. players